Illustrated Paper was a monthly psychedelic underground newspaper published in Mendocino, California from June 1966 to April 1967. Initially issued under the title The Paper, it became the Illustrated Paper with its third issue. Philip A. Bianchi (Sept. 26, 1938–Sept. 25, 1994) and Walter D. Wells were the editors. It was one of the earliest members of the Underground Press Syndicate (UPS). 

According to Abe Peck, the editor of the Chicago Seed who met the staff at the 1967 UPS conference in Stinson Beach, California, it was an "Oracle-style" paper and the staff raised animals and grew vegetables on communal land. A total of nine issues were published before it ceased publication in 1967.

See also
 List of underground newspapers of the 1960s counterculture

Notes

1966 establishments in California
Defunct newspapers published in California
Underground press